Mark Flanagan is a Welsh television actor best known for playing the character of Jinx in the Welsh soap Pobol y Cwm.

References

External links
 

Year of birth missing (living people)
Place of birth missing (living people)
Living people
Welsh male soap opera actors
21st-century Welsh male actors